A consular tribune was putatively a type of magistrate in the early Roman Republic. According to Roman tradition, colleges of consular tribunes held office throughout the fifth and fourth centuries BC during the so-called "Conflict of the Orders". The ancient historian Livy offered two explanations: the Roman state could have needed more magistrates to support its military endeavours; alternatively, the consular tribunate was offered in lieu of the ordinary consulship to plebeians so to maintain a patrician lock on the consulship. 

Modern views have challenged this account for various reasons. No consular tribune ever celebrated a triumph and appointment of military dictators was unabated through this period. Furthermore, the vast majority of consular tribunes elected were patrician. Some modern scholars believe the consular tribunes were elected to support Rome's expanded military presence in Italy or otherwise to command detachments and armies. More critical views believe the consular tribunate is an invention of later Roman historians meant to explain the appointment of multiple military commanders in the early republic while also trying to reconcile that with a preconceived notion of a permanent two-man consulship.

Name 
Roman sources used a variety of names to refer to consular tribunes. The emperor Claudius and Aulus Gellius called them tribunes  (with consular imperium).

Traditional account 

Under Roman tradition, starting in 444 BC, consular tribunes were elected in place of consuls as chief magistrates in fifty-one elections between 444 and 367 BC (seventy per cent of the time) and even more commonly between 408 and 367 BC. Livy offered two explanations: that increased demands for military leadership meant more magistrates were necessary or that it was a political tactic related to the Conflict of the Orders in which patricians prevented plebeians from holding the consulship by substituting this tribunate.

Livy states then that the choice whether a collegium of consular tribunes or consuls were to be elected for a given year was made by a decree of the Senate, producing an annual dispute as to which set of magistrates ought to be elected. The number of consular tribunes varied between three and six, and because they were considered colleagues of the two censors, there is sometimes mention of the "eight tribunes".

Originally patrician office holders, they were referred to as military tribunes and were responsible for leading the armies into battle. It was only much later that they were given the anachronistic addition of "with consular power", in an attempt to distinguish them from the military tribunes who were the legionary officers of the middle and late Republic.

The tribunes, like their consular predecessors, exercised consular potestas, indicating they must have been elected by the comitia centuriata, and that the current needs of the state could not be served by the previous consular system. From their initial number of three, the consular tribunes were increased to four for the first time in 426 BC in response to the military situation which saw the Roman state capture and annex Fidenae.

Then in 405 BC, the number of consular tribunes was increased to six for the first time; following that, various sources report show normal election – when tribunes were elected rather than consuls – of six consular tribunes except in 380 and 376 when nine and four were elected, respectively. The increase was due to the need for the consular tribunes to not only handle the military affairs of Rome, but also the administrative needs of the city as well. The Roman state was led by six consular tribunes for almost every year down to the dissolution of the office and the reintroduction of the consulship and the creation of the praetorship with the Sextian-Licinian Rogations.

Modern views 

The traditional account of the early Republic has come under substantial attack that "it was a literary creation of the late Republic" with little value for reconstructing the actual history of the early republic. As to the consular tribunes specifically, the traditional account in Livy may be reflection of his reliance on Licinius Macer, a previous annalist "fond of finding political motives where none had existed in the earlier historical tradition". Moreover, the early history of Roman military command may reflect annalists "massaging their evidence to make it fit their preconceptions about the structure of Rome's early government", reflecting Romans' common anachronistic and unhistorical treatment of the past.

The specific chronology in Livy also is questioned: "according to a tradition found in Eutropius, the first consular tribunes did not hold office until as late as 389 [BC]". Scholars also question whether tradition has confused cases where two consular tribunes were elected (due to fluctuation in numbers) with election of "consuls". All in all, it appears "suspiciously like these [traditional] explanations are simply inferences made from the most obvious differences between the two magistracies [the consular tribunate and the consulship]".

Military need 
Scholars also have rejected the emergence of the consular tribunate from the Conflict of the Orders: "Long ago [i.e., 1924], Meyer rejected Livy's assertion that the consular tribunate was a product of the Conflict of the Orders and instead suggested that increasing competition among patrician families drove up the annual number of commanders". The explanation that the consular tribunate was created to provide plebeians with access to the highest magistracy by a different name also is unconvincing insofar as those plebeians elected are few and late in this tribunate's history. In fact, after the institution of the consular tribunate, no plebeians appear in the fasti for 43 years from 444 to 401 BC.

Some modern scholars hold that the selection of consular tribunes reflected Rome's expanded military and administrative needs: that the consular tribunes, elected from the three ancient tribes of the Titienses, Ramnenses, and Luceres, were part of an overall redesign of the military structure of the Roman state to maximise military efficiency, which included the creation of the censorship (responsible for taking the census to identify the numbers of men capable of military duty) and the quaestorship (responsible for the supply of money and goods for the armies). Their appointment coincides with Roman expansion into central Italy; election of larger boards of consular tribunes may have been driven by military necessity. This explanation, however, is also somewhat incompatible with the continued appointing of military dictators, election of consular tribunes at time of peace, and their general lack of success in the field.

Private aristocrats 
More recently, some authors have argued that consular tribunes may have merely been aristocrats leading their own clients and retainers as private warbands or raiding parties before the Roman state developed its monopoly on military activity. R. Ross Holloway suggests that individual warlords, whose names and deeds (whether real or fictitious) would have been preserved in family traditions and records, were later anachronistically labeled "tribunes" (or consuls) by compilers who lived in a time when public office and military command went hand in hand.

Fred Drogula argued that consular tribunes and fictitious proconsulships were imputed into the early republic by historians like Livy and Dionysius (or their sources) to rationalise the number of reported officeholders with their preconceived notion of a permanent two-man consulship. Holloway, who is of the view that early Roman history was built upon synchronisms with Greek history – eg the fall of the monarchy being dated to around the same time as the expulsion of the tyrant Hippias from Athens,  – and that the number of consuls was not enough to match the number of years from the supposed beginning of the Republic, believes that consular tribunes were invented to fill the empty spaces in the records of yearly magistrates.

The end of the consular tribunate in 367 BC with the Sextian-Licinian rogations also is "undoubtedly" rejected as being caused by the Conflict of the Orders, attributed instead as reflecting increased demands for Roman government and institutionalisation of military command over a previous system without a fixed number of annual magistrate-commanders.

List of consular tribunes

See also
 Constitution of the Roman Republic

References

Citations

Sources

External links 
 Tribunus

Ancient Roman titles
Lists of office-holders in ancient Rome